The Imperial Russian Archaeological Society (Императорское Русское археологическое общество), originally known as the Archaeological-Numismatic Society, was an archaeological society in the Russian Empire. It was founded in St. Petersburg in 1846.

Selected publications
 Первый отчет Археологическо-нумизматического общества в Санкт-Петербурге. Заседания 1-5. — СПб., 1847.
 Mémoires de la société archéologique et de numismatique de St.-Petersburg (1847–1852). — Вып. 1—6.
 Перечень трудов и действий С.-Петербургского археологическо-нумизматического общества с половины 1846 по 1 генваря 1849 года. — СПб., 1849.
 Записки Санкт-Петербургского археолого-нумизматического общества (1847–1858) — 14 томов.
 Известия Русского археологического общества. Тома 1-10. — СПб., 1859–1884.
 Записки Русского археологического общества (Записки новой серии). — СПб., 1886–1902–12 томов.
 Медали присужденные Русским археологическим обществом в первое пятидесятилетие его существования. — СПб., 1899.

See also
 Imperial Russian Historical Society

References 

1846 establishments in the Russian Empire
Archaeological organizations